TTV Finance is a digital television channel operated by Taiwan Television (TTV) in Taiwan, launched on September 1, 2004. Now TTV Finance shares channel with TTV Family.

External links
 TTV Finance official website

Chinese-language television stations
Television channels and stations established in 2004
24-hour television news channels in Taiwan
Mass media in Taipei
2004 establishments in Taiwan
Taiwan Television